Sillathur is a village in the Orathanadu taluk of Thanjavur district, Tamil Nadu, India.

Demographics 

As per the 2001 census, Sillathur had a total population of 3730 with 1878 males and 1852 females. The sex ratio was 986. The literacy rate was 55.86.

References 

 

Villages in Thanjavur district